This is a list of 267 species in Neoperla, a genus of common stoneflies in the family Perlidae.

Neoperla species

 Neoperla adamantea Murányi & Weihai Li, 2015 c g
 Neoperla aeripennis (Enderlein, 1909) c g
 Neoperla aestiva Uchida, 1990 c g
 Neoperla affinis Zwick, P., 1983 c g
 Neoperla africana Klapálek, 1909 c g
 Neoperla agtouganon Sivec & Stark, 2011 c g
 Neoperla agumbe Stark & Sivec, 2015 c g
 Neoperla agusani Sivec, 1984 c g
 Neoperla alboguttata Zwick, P., 1986 c g
 Neoperla aliqua Zwick, P., 1973 c g
 Neoperla andreas Sivec & Stark, 2011 c g
 Neoperla angulata (Walker, F., 1852) c g
 Neoperla angustilobata Zwick, P., 1988 c g
 Neoperla anjiensis Yang, D. & C. Yang, 1998 c g
 Neoperla asperata Zwick, P., 1988 c g
 Neoperla asperipenis Zwick, P., 1980 c g
 Neoperla atropennis Banks, 1924 c g
 Neoperla baisha Kong & Weihai Li, 2014 c g
 Neoperla baishuijiangensis Du, Y., 2005 c g
 Neoperla banksi Illies, 1966 c g
 Neoperla baotianmana Li, Weihai & R. Wang, 2011 c g
 Neoperla bicolor Yang, Juan, S. Zhang & Weihai Li, 2017 c g
 Neoperla bicornua Wu, C.F., 1973 c g
 Neoperla bicornuta Yang, D. & C. Yang, 1995 c g
 Neoperla bicoronata Zwick, P., 1986 c g
 Neoperla bicurvata Kong & Weihai Li, 2014 c g
 Neoperla bilineata Wu, C.F. & Claassen, 1934 c g
 Neoperla bilobata Zwick, P., 1986 c g
 Neoperla binodosa (Wu, C.F., 1973) c g
 Neoperla biprojecta Du, Y., 2001 c g
 Neoperla biseriata Zwick, P. & Anbalagan, 2007 c g
 Neoperla bituberculata Du, Y., 2000 c g
 Neoperla borneensis (Enderlein, 1909) c g
 Neoperla bredoana Navás, 1932 c g
 Neoperla breviscrotata Du, Y., 1999 c g
 Neoperla brevistyla Li, Weihai & Murányi, 2013 c g
 Neoperla caii Li, Weihai, Ying Wang & R. Wang, 2017 c g
 Neoperla caligata (Burmeister, 1839) c g
 Neoperla cameronis Zwick, P., 1988 c g
 Neoperla carlsoni Stark and Baumann, 1978 i c g
 Neoperla catharae Stark and Baumann, 1978 i c g
 Neoperla cavaleriei (Navas, 1922) c g
 Neoperla cavalerieri Navas g
 Neoperla chebalinga Chen & Y. Du, 2016 c g
 Neoperla choctaw Stark and Baumann, 1978 i c g
 Neoperla chui Wu, C.F. & Claassen, 1934 c g
 Neoperla clara Stark & Sivec, 2008 c g
 Neoperla clymene (Newman, 1839) i c g b  (coastal stone)
 Neoperla connectens Zwick, P., 1986 c g
 Neoperla coosa Smith & Stark, 1998 i c g b  (coosa stone)
 Neoperla coralliata Uchida, 1990 c g
 Neoperla coreensis Ra, Kim, Kang & Ham, 1994 c g
 Neoperla coronata Zwick, P., 1988 c g
 Neoperla costalis (Klapálek, 1913) c g
 Neoperla coxi Stark, 1995 i c g
 Neoperla curvispina Wu, C.F., 1948 c g
 Neoperla daklak Stark & Sivec, 2008 c g
 Neoperla dao Stark & Sivec, 2008 c g
 Neoperla darlingi Stark & Sivec, 2007 c g
 Neoperla dashahena Du, Y., 2005 c g
 Neoperla dayak Zwick, P., 1986 c g
 Neoperla dentata Sivec, 1984 c g
 Neoperla diehli Sivec, 1985 c g
 Neoperla distincta Zwick, P., 1983 c g
 Neoperla divergens Zwick, P., 1986 c g
 Neoperla dolichocephala Klapálek, 1909 c g
 Neoperla dorsispina Yang, D. & C. Yang, 1996 c g
 Neoperla duratubulata Du, Y., 1999 c g
 Neoperla edmundsi Stark, 1983 c g
 Neoperla emarginata Stark & Sivec, 2015 c g
 Neoperla emeishana Li, Weihai, Ying Wang & R. Wang, 2017 c g
 Neoperla erecta Stark & Sivec, 2008 c g
 Neoperla falayah Stark and Lentz, 1988 i c g
 Neoperla fallax Klapálek, 1910 c g
 Neoperla fanjingshana Yang, D. & Jikun Yang, 1992 c g
 Neoperla flagellata Li, Weihai & Murányi, 2012 c g
 Neoperla flavescens Chu, 1929 c g
 Neoperla flavicincta Zwick, P., 1985 c g
 Neoperla flexiscrotata Du, Y., 2000 c g
 Neoperla flinti Sivec, 1984 c g
 Neoperla forcipata Yang, D. & Jikun Yang, 1992 c g
 Neoperla formosana Okamoto, 1912 c g
 Neoperla foveolata Klapálek, 1921 c g
 Neoperla furcata Zwick, P., 1986 c g
 Neoperla furcifera Klapálek, 1909 c g
 Neoperla furcomaculata Kong & Weihai Li, 2016 c g
 Neoperla furcostyla Li, Weihai & Qin, 2013 c g
 Neoperla gaufini Stark and Baumann, 1978 i c g
 Neoperla geniculata (Pictet, F.J., 1841) c g
 Neoperla geniculatella Okamoto, 1912 c g
 Neoperla goguryeo Murányi & Weihai Li, 2015 c g
 Neoperla gordonae Stark, 1983 c g
 Neoperla grafei Stark & Sheldon, 2009 c g
 Neoperla guangxiensis Du, Y. & Sivec, 2004 c g
 Neoperla hainanensis Yang, D. & C. Yang, 1995 c g
 Neoperla hamata Jewett, 1975 c g
 Neoperla han Stark, 1987 c g
 Neoperla harina Navás, 1929 c g
 Neoperla harperi Zwick, P., 1980 c g
 Neoperla harpi Ernst and Stewart, 1986 i c g
 Neoperla harrisi Stark and Lentz, 1988 i c g
 Neoperla hatakeyamae Okamoto, 1912 c g
 Neoperla henana Li, Weihai, L. Wu & H. Zhang, 2011 c g
 Neoperla hermosa Banks, 1924 c g
 Neoperla hoabinhica Navás, 1932 c g
 Neoperla hubbsi Ricker, 1952 c g
 Neoperla hubeiensis Li, Weihai & G. Wang, 2012 c g
 Neoperla hubleyi Stark & Sivec, 2008 c g
 Neoperla idella Stark & Sivec, 2008 c g
 Neoperla ignacsiveci Li, Weihai & X. Li, 2013 c g
 Neoperla illiesi Zwick, P., 1983 c g
 Neoperla indica Needham, 1909 c g
 Neoperla inexspectata Zwick, P., 1980 c g
 Neoperla infuscata Wu, C.F., 1935 c g
 Neoperla jacobsoni Klapálek, 1910 c g
 Neoperla jewetti Sivec, 1984 c g
 Neoperla jiangsuensis Chen & Y. Du, 2015 c g
 Neoperla jigongshana Li & Li g
 Neoperla jigonshana Li, Weihai & S. Li, 2014 c g
 Neoperla katmanduana Harper, P.P., 1977 c g
 Neoperla klapaleki Banks, 1937 c g
 Neoperla kunenensis (Barnard, 1934) c g
 Neoperla lahu Stark, 1983 c g
 Neoperla laotica Zwick, P., 1988 c g
 Neoperla latamaculata Du, Y., 2005 c g
 Neoperla latispina Wang, G. & Weihai Li, 2013 c g
 Neoperla leigongshana Du, Y. & Z. Wang, 2007 c g
 Neoperla leptacantha Stark & Sivec, 2008 c g
 Neoperla leptophallus Zwick, P., 1988 c g
 Neoperla leroiana Klapálek, 1911 c g
 Neoperla lieftincki Zwick, P., 1983 c g
 Neoperla lihuae Li, Weihai & Murányi, 2014 c g
 Neoperla lii Du, Y., 1999 c g
 Neoperla limbatella Navás, 1933 c g
 Neoperla longispina Wu, C.F., 1937 c g
 Neoperla longwangshana Yang, D. & C. Yang, 1998 c g
 Neoperla lui Du, Y. & Sivec, 2004 c g
 Neoperla lushana Wu, C.F., 1935 c g
 Neoperla luteola (Burmeister, 1839) c g
 Neoperla magisterchoui Du, Y., 2000 c g
 Neoperla mainensis Banks, 1948 i c g b  (Maine stone)
 Neoperla malleus Zwick, P., 1988 c g
 Neoperla maolanensis Yang, D. & Jikun Yang, 1993 c g
 Neoperla melanocephala Navás, 1931 c g
 Neoperla mesospina Li, Weihai & G. Wang, 2013 c g
 Neoperla mesostyla Li, Weihai & G. Wang, 2013 c g
 Neoperla microtumida Wu, C.F. & Claassen, 1934 c g
 Neoperla mindoroensis Pelingen AL, Freitag H, 2020
 Neoperla minor Chu, 1929 c g
 Neoperla minuta Du, Y. & Chen, 2016 c g
 Neoperla mnong Stark, 1987 c g
 Neoperla moesta Banks, 1939 c g
 Neoperla monacha Stark & Sivec, 2008 c g
 Neoperla montivaga Zwick, P., 1977 c g
 Neoperla multilobata Zwick, P., 1986 c g
 Neoperla multispinosa Stark & Sivec, 2008 c g
 Neoperla muranyi Yang, Juan, S. Zhang & Weihai Li, 2017 c g
 Neoperla naviculata Klapálek, 1909 c g
 Neoperla nebulosa Stark & Sivec, 2008 c g
 Neoperla nigra Sivec, 1984 c g
 Neoperla nigromarginata Li, Weihai & S. Q. Zhang, 2014 c g
 Neoperla niponensis (McLachlan, 1875) c g
 Neoperla nishidai Sivec, 1984 c g
 Neoperla nitida Kimmins, 1950 c g
 Neoperla nova Zwick, P., 1988 c g
 Neoperla obliqua Banks, 1913 c g
 Neoperla obscura Zwick, P., 1981 c g
 Neoperla obscurofulva (Wu, C.F., 1962) c g
 Neoperla occipitalis (Pictet, 1841) i c g
 Neoperla ochracea Zwick, P., 1981 c g
 Neoperla oculata Banks, 1924 c g
 Neoperla orissa Stark & Sivec, 2015 c g
 Neoperla osage Stark and Lentz, 1988 i c g
 Neoperla palawan Sivec & Stark, 2011 c g
 Neoperla pallescens Banks, 1937 c g
 Neoperla pallicornis Banks, 1937 c g
 Neoperla pani Chen & Y. Du, 2016 c g
 Neoperla parva Banks, 1939 c g
 Neoperla paucispinosa Zwick, P., 1986 c g
 Neoperla perspicillata Zwick, P., 1980 c g
 Neoperla peterzwicki Stark & Sivec, 2008 c g
 Neoperla philippina Sivec, 1984 c g
 Neoperla pilosella Klapalek, 1905 c g
 Neoperla pluvia Uchida, 1990 c g
 Neoperla primitiva Geijskes, 1952 c g
 Neoperla propinqua Zwick, P., 1983 c g
 Neoperla pseudorecta Sivec, 1984 c g
 Neoperla punan Zwick, P., 1986 c g
 Neoperla qinglingensis Du, Y., 2005 c g
 Neoperla qingyuanensis Yang, D. & C. Yang, 1995 c g
 Neoperla quadrata Wu, C.F. & Claassen, 1934 c g
 Neoperla ramosa (Navás, 1919) c g
 Neoperla recta Banks, 1913 c g
 Neoperla reticulata Zwick, P., 1986 c g
 Neoperla rigidipenis Zwick, P., 1983 c g
 Neoperla robisoni Poulton and Stewart, 1986 i c g
 Neoperla rotunda Wu, C.F., 1948 c g
 Neoperla rougemonti Zwick, P., 1986 c g
 Neoperla sabah Zwick, P., 1986 c g
 Neoperla sabang Sivec & Stark, 2011 c g
 Neoperla salakot Sivec & Stark, 2011 c g
 Neoperla saraburi Zwick, P., 1988 c g
 Neoperla sarawak Zwick, P., 1986 c g
 Neoperla sauteri Klapálek, 1912 c g
 Neoperla schlitz Stark & Sivec, 2008 c g
 Neoperla schmidi Aubert, 1959 c g
 Neoperla schmidiana Zwick, P., 1981 c g
 Neoperla securifera Zwick, P., 1986 c g
 Neoperla separanda Zwick, P., 1983 c g
 Neoperla seriespinosa Zwick, P., 1986 c g
 Neoperla serrata Zwick, P., 1988 c g
 Neoperla sexlobata Chen & Y. Du, 2016 c g
 Neoperla signatalis Banks, 1937 c g
 Neoperla silvaeae Zwick, P., 1986 c g
 Neoperla similidella Li, Weihai & G. Wang, 2013 c g
 Neoperla similiflavescens Li, Weihai & S. Q. Zhang, 2014 c g
 Neoperla similiserecta Wang, G. & Weihai Li, 2012 c g
 Neoperla simplicior Navás, 1932 c g
 Neoperla sinensis Chu, 1928 c g
 Neoperla sinuata Stark & Sivec, 2008 c g
 Neoperla sitahoanensis Sivec, 1985 c g
 Neoperla siveci Zwick, P., 1980 c g
 Neoperla song Stark & Sivec, 2008 c g
 Neoperla spinaloba Stark & Sivec, 2008 c g
 Neoperla spinosa Zwick, P., 1986 c g
 Neoperla spio (Newman, 1839) c g
 Neoperla starki Zwick, P., 1986 c g
 Neoperla stewarti Stark and Baumann, 1978 i c g
 Neoperla stueberae Zwick, P., 1983 c g
 Neoperla sumatrana (Enderlein, 1909) c g
 Neoperla sungi Cao, T.K.T. & Bae, 2007 c g
 Neoperla tadpolata Li & Muranyi g
 Neoperla taibaina Du, Y., 2005 c g
 Neoperla taihorinensis (Klapálek, 1913) c g
 Neoperla taiwanica Sivec & P. Zwick, 1987 c g
 Neoperla tamdao Cao, T.K.T. & Bae, 2007 c g
 Neoperla tenuispina Klapálek, 1921 c g
 Neoperla teresa Stark & Sivec, 2008 c g
 Neoperla tetrapoda Zwick, P., 1986 c g
 Neoperla thai Stark, 1983 c g
 Neoperla theobromae Zwick, P., 1986 c g
 Neoperla tingwushanensis Wu, C.F., 1935 c g
 Neoperla tortipenis Zwick, P., 1980 c g
 Neoperla transversprojecta Du, Y. & Sivec, 2004 c g
 Neoperla triangulata Kawai, 1975 c g
 Neoperla truncata Wu, C.F., 1948 c g
 Neoperla tuberculata Wu, C.F., 1937 c g
 Neoperla unicolor Zwick, P., 1986 c g
 Neoperla uniformis Banks, 1937 c g
 Neoperla ussurica Sivec & Zhiltzova, 1996 c g
 Neoperla vallis Uchida, 1990 c g
 Neoperla variegata Klapálek, 1909 c g
 Neoperla venosa Kimmins, 1950 c g
 Neoperla verna Uchida, 1990 c g
 Neoperla vesperi Zwick, P., 1983 c g
 Neoperla wagneri Sivec, 1984 c g
 Neoperla wui Yang, C. & D. Yang, 1990 c g
 Neoperla wuzhishana Chen & Y. Du, 2016 c g
 Neoperla xuansongae Li, Weihai & Wenliang Li, 2013 c g
 Neoperla yanlii Li, Weihai & R. Wang, 2014 c g
 Neoperla yao Stark, 1987 c g
 Neoperla yaoshana Li, Weihai, H. Wang & W. Lu, 2011 c g
 Neoperla yentu Cao, T.K.T. & Bae, 2007 c g
 Neoperla yingshana Chen & Du, 2017 g
 Neoperla yunnana Li & Wang g
 Neoperla zhiltzovae Teslenko, 2012 c g
 Neoperla zonata Stark & Sivec, 2008 c g
 Neoperla zwicki Sivec, 1984 c g

Data sources: i = ITIS, c = Catalogue of Life, g = GBIF, b = Bugguide.net

References

Neoperla
Articles created by Qbugbot